Quid, Inc. is a private software and services company, specializing in text-based data analysis. Quid software can read millions of documents (e.g. news articles, blog posts, company profiles, and patents) and offers insight by organizing that content visually.

Quid clients have historically included technology companies and research teams who use Quid market landscapes to analyze investment trends, gain competitive intelligence, and map innovation. It has since expanded its customer base to serve large corporations in healthcare, consulting, finance, industrials, consumer goods, advertising/marketing, as well as government organizations.

In 2013, Quid was named by Fast Company as one of the World's Top 10 Most Innovative companies in Big Data. In 2016, World Economic Forum presented Quid with their Technology Pioneers award and IDC (International Data Corporation) named Quid a Top Innovator for the 2016 U.S. Financial Compliance and Risk Analytics Market.

The company is based in San Francisco with offices in New York City and London.

Quid, Inc. merged with the social analytics company NetBase on January 28, 2020.

Customers 
The media has cited a handful of notable Quid clients including the Boston Consulting Group, the Department of Defense, the UN Global Pulse +, various political campaigns, and the Knight Foundation.

Applications

The Press
Quid is often used by publications for its data analysis and visualizations. For example, Fast Company (magazine) leveraged Quid to pick its annual Most Innovative Companies list.

Other examples include Fortune analyzing VC funding trends, The Atlantic reporting coincidences collected by a University of Cambridge professor, VentureBeat analyzing the media's backlash of Uber, Wired diving into the language used at Presidential party conventions, and more from outlets such as the Economist, the New York Times, Forbes, and the San Francisco Chronicle.

Criticism
In 2010, TechCrunch asked: “Does Quid have the most pretentious website of any startup ever?” The jab followed a debate on Quora discussing the website's use of Latin, arcane typefaces, and an overly academic tone. The company has since updated its website.

References

External links 
 Quid Inc.

Business software companies
Big data companies
Software companies established in 2010
Software companies based in the San Francisco Bay Area
Companies based in San Francisco
Defunct software companies of the United States
American companies established in 2010